was a Japanese daimyō of the Edo period, who ruled the Uruido, Koga and Yodo Domains. The eldest son of Nagai Naokatsu, he fought at the Battle of Sekigahara and the siege of Osaka. During the Shimabara Rebellion he was assigned to defend Kyoto.

Naomasa held  and the title of Shinano no Kami. He retired in early 1658 and became a monk, taking the name Shinsai.

References
 Yodo domain on "Edo 300 HTML" (11 December 2007)
 "Nagai hon-ke" (11 December 2007)

|-

|-

Japanese Buddhist clergy
Daimyo
1587 births
1668 deaths